Goodwood Heights is a suburb of Auckland, New Zealand. It is located approximately 20 kilometres southeast of the Auckland CBD; to the north of Totara Heights, east of Manukau Central and south of Chapel Downs. It was formerly part of Manukau City until the merger of all of Auckland's councils into the 'super city' in 2010.

Demographics

Goodwood Heights had a population of 4,401 at the 2018 New Zealand census, an increase of 330 people (8.1%) since the 2013 census, and an increase of 567 people (14.8%) since the 2006 census. There were 1,143 households, comprising 2,238 males and 2,166 females, giving a sex ratio of 1.03 males per female. The median age was 34.5 years (compared with 37.4 years nationally), with 843 people (19.2%) aged under 15 years, 1,035 (23.5%) aged 15 to 29, 2,082 (47.3%) aged 30 to 64, and 438 (10.0%) aged 65 or older.

Ethnicities were 25.2% European/Pākehā, 11.5% Māori, 19.0% Pacific peoples, 55.3% Asian, and 2.7% other ethnicities. People may identify with more than one ethnicity.

The percentage of people born overseas was 51.5, compared with 27.1% nationally.

Although some people chose not to answer the census's question about religious affiliation, 25.1% had no religion, 35.1% were Christian, 0.7% had Māori religious beliefs, 18.0% were Hindu, 6.3% were Muslim, 3.5% were Buddhist and 6.3% had other religions.

Of those at least 15 years old, 816 (22.9%) people had a bachelor's or higher degree, and 519 (14.6%) people had no formal qualifications. The median income was $36,400, compared with $31,800 nationally. 576 people (16.2%) earned over $70,000 compared to 17.2% nationally. The employment status of those at least 15 was that 1,980 (55.6%) people were employed full-time, 411 (11.6%) were part-time, and 144 (4.0%) were unemployed.

Education

References

Suburbs of Auckland